Joseph Warner Henley, PC, DL, JP (3 March 1793 – 8 December 1884), often known as J. W. Henley, was a British Conservative politician, best known for serving in the protectionist governments of Lord Derby in the 1850s.

Political career
Henley sat as Member of Parliament for Oxfordshire from 1841 until 1878 and  served as President of the Board of Trade in Derby's first (1852) and second (1858–1859) governments. He was sworn of the Privy Council in 1852. From 1874 to 1878 (year of his 84th birthday) he was the oldest member of the House of Commons.

Family
Henley married Georgiana, daughter of John Fane, in 1816. She died in June 1864. Henley survived her by 20 years and died in December 1884, aged 91.

References

Descendants of George Greaves and Mary Marriott
The Magistracy of Buckinghamshire in 1861

External links 
 

1793 births
1884 deaths
Members of the Privy Council of the United Kingdom
Conservative Party (UK) MPs for English constituencies
UK MPs 1841–1847
UK MPs 1847–1852
UK MPs 1852–1857
UK MPs 1857–1859
UK MPs 1859–1865
UK MPs 1865–1868
UK MPs 1868–1874
UK MPs 1874–1880
Presidents of the Board of Trade
English justices of the peace